Klaus Kinski (born Klaus Günter Karl Nakszynski 18 October 1926 – 23 November 1991) was a German actor, equally renowned for his intense performance style and notorious for his volatile personality. He appeared in over 130 film roles in a career that spanned 40 years, from 1948 to 1988. He played leading parts in five films directed by Werner Herzog (Aguirre, the Wrath of God, 1972; Nosferatu the Vampyre, 1979; Woyzeck, also 1979; Fitzcarraldo, 1982; Cobra Verde, 1987), who later chronicled their tumultuous relationship in the documentary My Best Fiend (1999).

Kinski's roles spanned multiple genres, languages, and nationalities, including many Spaghetti Westerns (such as For a Few Dollars More, 1965; A Bullet for the General, 1966; The Great Silence, 1968; And God Said to Cain, 1970), horror films, war movies, dramas, and Edgar Wallace krimi pictures. His infamy was elevated by a number of eccentric creative endeavors, including a one-man show based on the life of Jesus Christ, a self-directed biographical film of violinist Niccolò Paganini, and over 20 spoken word albums.

During his lifetime, Kinski was a controversial and aggressive figure, prone to emotional and often violent outbursts directed at his directors and fellow cast members, issues further complicated by a history of mental illness. Herzog described him as "one of the greatest actors of the century, but also a monster and a great pestilence." Posthumously, his legacy has been further tangled by accusations of physical and sexual abuse of his daughters Pola and Nastassja, themselves actresses. His notoriety and prolific output has developed into a widespread cult following and a reputation as a popular icon.

Early life

Klaus Günter Karl Nakszynski was born to German nationals in Zoppot, Free City of Danzig (now Sopot, Poland) in 1926. His father, Bruno Nakszynski, was a failed opera singer turned pharmacist; his mother, Susanne (née Lutze), was a nurse and the daughter of a local pastor. Klaus had three older siblings, Inge, Arne and Hans-Joachim.

Due to the Great Depression, the family was unable to make a living in Danzig and moved to Berlin in 1931, where they also struggled. They settled in a flat in the Wartburgstraße 3, in the district of Schöneberg, and took German citizenship. In 1936, Kinski attended the Prinz-Heinrich-Gymnasium in Schöneberg.

During the Second World War, Kinski was conscripted at the age of 17 into the German Wehrmacht some time in 1943, and served with the German Air Force (Luftwaffe) as an elite paratrooper (Fallschirmjäger). He saw no action until the winter of 1944, when his unit was transferred to the Netherlands. He was captured by the British on his second day of combat.

Kinski expanded upon this in his 1988 autobiography. He said that he made a conscious decision to desert; he had been captured by the Germans, court-martialed as a deserter and sentenced to death, but he escaped and hid in the woods. A British patrol opened fire on him, he was wounded in the arm and they took him captive. After being treated for his injuries and interrogated, Kinski was transferred to a prisoner of war camp in Britain. The ship transporting him was torpedoed by a German U-boat, but arrived safely. He was held at the prisoner of war Camp 186 in Berechurch Hall in Colchester, Essex.

Werner Herzog, in his 1999 documentary My Best Fiend about Kinski, claimed that Kinski had fabricated much of his autobiography, including claims of maternal sexual abuse, incest, and childhood poverty. According to Herzog, Kinski was actually raised in a financially-stable upper-middle-class family.

Career
While in Berechurch Hall, Kinski played his first roles on stage, taking part in variety shows intended to maintain morale among the prisoners. By May 1945, at the end of the war in Europe, the German POWs were anxious to return home. Kinski had heard that sick prisoners were to be returned first, and tried to qualify by standing outside naked at night, drinking urine and eating cigarettes. He remained healthy however, and was finally returned to Germany in 1946, after spending a year and four months in captivity.

Arriving in Berlin, he learned his father had died during the war, and his mother had been killed in an Allied air attack on the city.

Theatrical career
After his return to Germany, Kinski started out as an actor, first at a small touring company in Offenburg, where he used his newly adopted name of Klaus Kinski. In 1946, he was hired by the renowned Schlosspark-Theater in Berlin. The next year, he was fired by the manager due to his unpredictable behavior. Other companies followed, but his unconventional and emotionally volatile behavior regularly got him into trouble.

For three months in 1955, Kinski lived in the same boarding house as a 13-year-old Werner Herzog, who would later direct him in a number of films. In the 1999 documentary My Best Fiend, Herzog described how Kinski locked himself in the communal bathroom for 48 hours and broke everything in the room to pieces.

In March 1956, he made a single guest appearance at Vienna's Burgtheater in Goethe's Torquato Tasso. Although respected by his colleagues, among them Judith Holzmeister, and cheered by the audience, Kinski did not gain a permanent contract. The Burgtheater's management became aware of the actor's earlier difficulties in Germany. He unsuccessfully tried to sue the company.

Living jobless in Vienna, Kinski reinvented himself as a monologist and spoken word artist. He presented the prose and verse of François Villon, William Shakespeare and Oscar Wilde, amongst others. He established himself as an actor touring Austria, Germany, and Switzerland with his shows.

Film work
 
Kinski's first film role was a small part in the 1948 film Morituri. He appeared in several German Edgar Wallace movies, and had bit parts in the American war films Decision Before Dawn (1951), A Time to Love and a Time to Die (1958), and The Counterfeit Traitor (1962). In Alfred Vohrer's Die toten Augen von London (1961), his character refused any personal guilt for his evil deeds and claimed to have only followed the orders given to him. Kinski's performance reflected post-war Germany's reluctance to take responsibility for what had happened during World War II.

During the 1960s and 1970s, he appeared in various European exploitation film genres, as well as more acclaimed works such as Doctor Zhivago (1965), featured in a supporting role as an anarchist prisoner on his way to the Gulag.

He relocated to Italy during the late 1960s, and had roles in numerous Spaghetti Westerns, including For a Few Dollars More (1965), A Bullet for the General (1966), The Great Silence (1968), Twice A Judas (1969), and A Genius, Two Partners and a Dupe (1975). In 1977, he starred as the guerrillero Wilfried Böse in Operation Thunderbolt, based on the events of the 1976 Operation Entebbe.

Kinski's work with director Werner Herzog brought him international recognition. They made five films together: Aguirre: The Wrath of God (1972), Woyzeck (1978), Nosferatu the Vampyre (1979), Fitzcarraldo (1982) and Cobra Verde (1987). Despite their collaborations, Herzog had threatened, on occasion, to murder Kinski. In one incident, Kinski was said to have been saved by his dog who attacked Herzog as he crept up to supposedly burn down the actor's house. Herzog has refused to comment on his numerous other plans to kill Kinski. However, he did pull a gun on Kinski, or at least threatened to do so, on the set of Aguirre, the Wrath of God, after the actor threatened to walk off the set.

In 1980, Kinski refused the lead villain role of Major Arnold Toht in Raiders of the Lost Ark, telling director Steven Spielberg, "This script is a yawn-making, boring pile of shit" and "moronically shitty". Kinski would go on to play Kurtz, an Israeli intelligence officer, in The Little Drummer Girl, a feature film by George Roy Hill in 1984. It also starred Diane Keaton as Charlie.

Kinski co-starred as an evil killer from the future in a 1987 Sci-Fi based TV film Timestalkers with William Devane and Lauren Hutton. His last film (which he wrote and directed) was Kinski Paganini (1989), in which he played the legendary violinist Niccolò Paganini.

Personal life
Kinski was married three times. He married his first wife, singer Gislinde Kühlbeck, in 1952. The couple had a daughter, Pola Kinski. They divorced in 1955.  Five years later he married actress Ruth Brigitte Tocki. They divorced in 1971. Their daughter Nastassja Kinski was born in January 1961. He married his third and final wife, model Minhoi Geneviève Loanic, in 1971. Their son Nikolai Kinski was born in 1976. They divorced in 1979.

Kinski published his autobiography, All I Need Is Love, in 1988 (reprinted in 1996 as Kinski Uncut). The book infuriated many and prompted his second daughter Nastassja Kinski to file a libel suit against him, which she afterward withdrew.

Mental illness
In 1950, Kinski stayed in Karl-Bonhoeffer-Nervenklinik (de), a psychiatric hospital, for three days because he stalked his theatrical sponsor and eventually tried to strangle her. Medical records from the period listed a preliminary diagnosis of schizophrenia but the conclusion was psychopathy (antisocial personality disorder). Around this time Kinski became unable to secure film roles, and in 1955 he attempted suicide twice according to one source.

Sexual abuse 
In 2013, more than 20 years after her father's death, Pola Kinski published an autobiography titled Kindermund (or From a Child's Mouth), in which she claimed her father had sexually abused her from the age of 5 to 19.

In an interview published by the German tabloid Bild on 13 January 2013, Kinski's younger daughter and Pola's half-sister, Nastassja, said their father would embrace her in a sexual manner when she was 4–5 years old but never had sex with her. Nastassja has expressed support for Pola and said that she was always afraid of their father, whom she described as an unpredictable tyrant.

Death
Kinski died on 23 November 1991 of a sudden heart attack at his home in Lagunitas, California at age 65. His body was cremated and his ashes were scattered into the Pacific Ocean.

Of his three children, only his son Nikolai attended the funeral.

Legacy

Werner Herzog, in his 1999 documentary about Kinski titled My Best Fiend, claimed that Kinski had fabricated much of his autobiography, and told of the difficulties in their working relationship. Director David Schmoeller released a short 1999 film titled Please Kill Mr. Kinski, which examined the stories of Kinski's erratic and disruptive behavior on the set of his 1986 film Crawlspace. The film features behind-the-scenes footage of Kinski's various confrontations with director and crewmembers, along with Schmoeller's account of the events, in which he claims a producer offered to murder Kinski for his life insurance money.

In 2006, Christian David published the first comprehensive biography of Kinski, based on newly discovered archived material, personal letters and interviews with the actor's friends and colleagues. Peter Geyer published a paperback book of essays on Kinski's life and work.

In popular culture
 Independent film director Maverick Moore parodied both Louis Malle's film My Dinner with Andre and, "the totally bonkers friendship between legendary filmmaker Werner Herzog and controversial actor Klaus Kinski" as chronicled in the documentaries Burden of Dreams and My Best Fiend, in the awarding-winning short black comedy film My Dinner with Werner.
 German actor and parodist Max Giermann often parodied Klaus Kinski in various TV shows, including Sketch History or on the award shows Deutscher Comedypreis or Goldene Kamera.

Filmography and discography

Bibliography
 Ich bin so wild nach deinem Erdbeermund. München: :de:Rogner & Bernhard 1975 
 All I need is love. New York : Random House, 1988. 
 Paganini. München: Heyne Verlag 1992 
 Kinski uncut the autobiography of Klaus Kinski. London: Bloomsbury 1997 
 (with Peter Geyer) Jesus Christus Erlöser und Fieber – Tagebuch eines Aussätzigen. Frankfurt: Suhrkamp, 2006

References

External links

 
 

1926 births
1991 deaths
People from Sopot
Naturalized citizens of Germany
German male film actors
German people of Polish descent
German spoken word artists
German male stage actors
German prisoners of war in World War II held by the United Kingdom
20th-century German male actors
People from Marin County, California
People from the Free City of Danzig
German Film Award winners
People with antisocial personality disorder
Fallschirmjäger of World War II
Male Spaghetti Western actors
Deaths from coronary thrombosis